Virgin Radio is a music-based Italian radio station, which started nationwide broadcasting on 12 July 2007 at 12:00 AM (with the song What a Wonderful World by Joey Ramone). It is owned by Mediaset and the programming consists of rock music (rockabilly, hard rock, punk rock, rock and roll and more).

Virgin Radio TV 
Virgin Radio TV was an Italian music television channel, launched on 30 November 2010. Freely available on selected local digital terrestrial television networks in Italy and on Hotbird 8, feature a separate programming and music playlist from his radio counterpart.
On 1 August 2012 it ceased broadcasting only in digital terrestrial television.

External links 
  
  

Mass media in Milan
Radio stations in Italy
Television channels in Italy
Virgin Radio
Rock radio stations
Italian-language television stations
Radio stations established in 2007
Television channels and stations established in 2010
Italian companies established in 2007
Italian companies established in 2010
Mediaset
Mediaset television channels